Belik or Byelik is a gender-neutral Slavic surname (Белик,Бєлік). Notable people with the surname include:

Oleksiy Byelik (born 1981), Ukrainian association football striker
Vera Belik (1921–1944), Russian name of a Ukrainian aircraft navigator, Ukrainian Білик, Bilyk
Dmitry Belik

See also 
Belikov